Silvio Tendler (born 1950) is a Brazilian filmmaker. With more than 40 films released by 2014, including feature and short films, Tendler is one of the most respected Brazilian documentarist. Due to his focus on people like Juscelino Kubitschek, João Goulart, and Carlos Marighella, he is known as "the filmmaker of the defeated" or "the filmmaker of interrupted dreams".

Biography
Born in Rio de Janeiro in 1950, Tendler is graduated in History at the Paris Diderot University (1975), majored in Cinema and History at the École pratique des hautes études in Sorbonne (1976), and especialized in Documentary Cinema Applied to Social Sciences at the Musée Guimet in Sorbonne (1973). During his stay in France, he worked on the collaborative documentary La spirale in 1975 with several directors, among them Chris Marker. The acquaintanceship with Marker and other filmmakers, including Jean Rouch, Wladimir Carvalho, Santiago Álvarez and Joris Ivens is remarked by Tendler.

He returned from France to Brazil, and decided to make a film about Juscelino Kubitschek. It resulted in Os Anos JK – Uma Trajetória Política (1980), a box office success with 800,000 viewers. In 1981, he directed a film about Os Trapalhões, O Mundo Mágico dos Trapalhões, which became the most watched Brazilian documentary of all time with over 1.8 million viewers. In that same year, he created Caliban Produções Cinematográficas, a production company focused on historical biographies.

Filmography

Feature films
Os Anos JK – Uma Trajetória Política (1980)
O Mundo Mágico dos Trapalhões (1981)
Jango (1984)
Castro Alves - Retrato Falado do Poeta  (1998)
Glauber o Filme, Labirinto do Brasil (2003)
Encontro com Milton Santos: O Mundo Global Visto do Lado de Cá (2006)
Utopia e Barbárie (2008)
Tancredo, a Travessia (2010)
O veneno está na mesa (2011)
O veneno está na mesa 2 (2014)

References

External links
 

1950 births
Brazilian Jews
Brazilian film directors
Brazilian film producers
Brazilian documentary film directors
Documentary film producers
Living people